Samaneh Sheshpari (born 1 September 1987) is a retired Iranian taekwondo practitioner. In 2010, she won one of the bronze medals in the women's 53 kg event at the 2010 Asian Games held in Guangzhou, China. In 2014, she competed in the women's 57 kg event at the 2014 Asian Games held in Incheon, South Korea without winning a medal.

She won the silver medal in the women's 53 kg event at the Asian Taekwondo Championships both in 2010 and in 2012. In 2013, she won the silver medal in this event at the 2013 Islamic Solidarity Games in Palembang, Indonesia.

References

External links 
 

Living people
1987 births
Sportspeople from Tehran
Iranian female taekwondo practitioners
Taekwondo practitioners at the 2010 Asian Games
Taekwondo practitioners at the 2014 Asian Games
Medalists at the 2010 Asian Games
Asian Games bronze medalists for Iran
Asian Games medalists in taekwondo
Islamic Solidarity Games competitors for Iran
Islamic Solidarity Games medalists in taekwondo
21st-century Iranian women